The 9th National Congress of the Chinese Communist Party was a pivotal Communist Party Congress in China during the height of the Cultural Revolution. It was held in Beijing, in the Great Hall of the People, China, between April 1 and 24, 1969. It set in motion the 9th Central Committee of the Chinese Communist Party.  It was preceded by the lengthy 8th Congress.  The Congress formally ratified the political purge of Liu Shaoqi and Deng Xiaoping, and elevated Mao's radical allies to power.  It was formally succeeded by the 10th National Congress.

Lin Biao delivered the keynote political report at the congress. The report lauded Mao's concept of continuous revolution, i.e., that the bourgeoisie continues to attempt capitalist restoration after they have been overthrown from power, and that such attempts should be struck down preemptively. Lin's keynote address was strongly applauded by the delegates, and frequently interrupted by rounds of slogan-chanting. The Congress labeled Liu Shaoqi as the "exemplification of the bourgeoisie".

1,512 delegates were represented at the Congress, although they were not all members of the Party. A significant number represented Red Guards groups, and there was a marked increase in the size of the PLA delegation, many of whom were loyal to Lin Biao.

At the Congress, Mao's "continuous revolution" ideology was written into the Party Constitution. Lin Biao was named "the close comrade-in-arms of Chairman Mao and his successor".

The Central Secretariat and the Central Control Commission (the predecessor of the Central Commission for Discipline Inspection) were both abolished at this Congress. The Congress elected 170 full members and 109 alternate members of the 9th Central Committee. Of these full and alternate members, only 53 were part of the 8th Central Committee. The significant turnover (~82%) on the party's nominally highest body demonstrated the extent to which the party establishment had been 'cleansed' during the preceding years of the Cultural Revolution.

After Deng Xiaoping took power in 1978, the Congress was deemed to have been "incorrect ideologically, politically, and organizationally. The guiding directions of the congress were, on the whole, wrong." Part of the Long Live the Victory of Mao Zedong Thought statue includes a group of soldiers and civilians propagating the appeal of the 9th National Congress of the Chinese Communist Party.

References

National Congress of the Chinese Communist Party
1969 in China
1969 conferences